The Khor is a river in Khabarovsk Krai. It is a right tributary of the Ussuri.

It rises on the western slope of the Northern Sikhote-Alin. The urban-type settlement Khor is located on the river bank near the mouth.

References

Rivers of Khabarovsk Krai